Brașov-Ghimbav International Airport (ICAO: LROV) is an airport development project located in Ghimbav, near Brașov, Romania, right by the future A3 motorway. It is the first airport to be built in post-communist Romania, and the 17th commercial airport in the country. Flights are expected to commence in 16 June 2023.

History
The project is widely supported by the local population and some businesses in the area have announced plans to switch to air freight services. It is expected that the airport will create 4,000 jobs and reach 1 million passengers in 8 years, with a further 6,000 jobs being generated indirectly. Planned costs of the project are estimated at €87 million.

In 2006, the Romanian State Domain Agency transferred 110 hectares of land to Brașov County. Intelcan Canada was to develop and build the airport in coordination with Brașov, Harghita, and Covasna counties as well as Ghimbav city. The airport's charter was officially signed on 14 November 2005. Intelcan inaugurated the construction of the airport on 15 April 2008. The initial target for completion was twenty-four to thirty months. However, due to legal matters and a lack of funds, the construction works had stopped and Intelcan left the project, being replaced by the local authorities.

On 18 November 2012, the Brașov County authorities signed a €12.7 million (VAT excluded) contract with Vectra Service, a local construction company, for building the runway. Eventually, construction of the airport restarted in April 2013 with the works at the  runway. On 3 October 2014, the runway was officially inaugurated. Ronan Keating was the first passenger to ever use the airport runway in 2019, five years after it was built.

Construction works for the passenger terminal started on 17 March 2020 and were completed by March 2021.

CFR announced a feasibility study for the construction of an 8-km rail connection from the airport to the Brașov railway station. The study was contracted in September 2020 and the rail line will be financed from the Next Generation EU recovery fund. The total cost of this investment was estimated at €300 million.

In the first year of operations, the airport is expected to service 300,000 passengers.

Interest has already been shown by flight operators from Germany (Lufthansa), Poland (LOT Polish Airlines), Turkey (Turkish Airlines), Hungary (Wizz Air), and Israel (El Al), but also from internal operators, from Constanța (Blue Air) and Bucharest (Air Bucharest and TAROM).

Airlines and destinations
The following airlines will operate flights at Brașov-Ghimbav International Airport:

See also
Aviation in Romania
Transport in Romania

References

External links
 "Brasov County Council official website".  2020. 
 Project's website
 Brașov City Council. "General Information on Brașov International Airport". August 30, 2006. (archived)

Brasov
Proposed airports
Proposed transport infrastructure in Romania